The United Kingdom participated in the Eurovision Song Contest for the first time in . The British Broadcasting Corporation (BBC) organised a national final, the Festival of British Popular Songs, to select the United Kingdom's entry for the contest. The country was represented by Patricia Bredin with the song "All" written by Reynell Wreford and Alan Stranks.

Before Eurovision

Festival of British Popular Songs 

The 1957 contest was the United Kingdom's first participation in the contest.

The Festival of British Popular Songs 1957 consisted of three semi finals and a grand final. All shows were presented by David Jacobs, who would host many other British national finals the following years. Seven singers presented one song each in the first two semi finals. In the third semi final, five songs took part. Most song titles and results in the heats were lost.

The songs were scored by ten twelve-member juries, representing Birmingham, Aberdeen, Cardiff, Newcastle, Belfast, Manchester, Bangor, Bristol, Glasgow, and London. Each juror awarded one point to their favourite song. Two songs in each heat advanced to the national final, where every song was presented twice by two different artists and with a different arrangement. With the exception of the song "Once", the first performance was by the singer who performed it in the semi final, and the second performance was by an artist who had not taken part in the heats. After the show, the BBC internally chose Patricia Bredin to perform the song in Frankfurt.

Shows

Commercial success 
None of the competing songs reached the UK single charts despite the popularity of some of the contestants. Hull born actress and occasional singer Patricia Bredin never recorded the winning song, the ballad "All", and it was therefore also never released as a single. The only known studio recording of the song was released the same year by English singer Robert Earl. This version was later included on the compilation album "If You Can Dream" by Vocalion Records together with all other tracks from his first 17 singles.

At Eurovision 
Patricia Bredin delivered an operatic performance of "All", performing third that night following  and preceding  with "Corde della mia chitarra". The conductor was Eric Robinson. At a length of 1:52 minutes, it was the shortest entry in the history of the contest until Finland in 2015 as well as being the first song to be performed in English. The song also turned out to perform right before Italy's "Corde della mia chitarra", the longest entry in the history of the contest at 5:09 minutes.

At the close of voting, the United Kingdom had received six points and finished seventh among the ten countries, despite points from five of the nine other countries. It would take the United Kingdom until  not to finish in the first half of the scoreboard again.

Voting 
Every country had a jury of ten people. Every juror could give one point to their favourite song.

References 

1957
Countries in the Eurovision Song Contest 1957
Eurovision
Eurovision